All visitors arriving in the Federated States of Micronesia must have a valid passport or other travel document issued by the government of the country of citizenship or nationality. The document must be valid for at least 120 days beyond the date of entry. Exception to this rule are the citizens and nationals of the Federated States of Micronesia, Republic of Palau, the Republic of the Marshall Islands, or the United States who may also prove citizenship or nationality by birth certificate or entry permit. Their nationals are also issued an entry permit valid for up to a year. Other nationalities are allowed stay of 30 days that may be extended up to 60 days. Departure Tax applies.

Micronesia signed a mutual visa-waiver agreement with the European Union on 20 September 2016. This agreement allows all citizens of states that are contracting parties to the Schengen Agreement to stay without a visa for a maximum period of 90 days in any 180-day period.

Visa policy map

Visa free stay period
Citizens of the following countries can enter Micronesia for the following periods:

Statistics

Most visitors arriving to Micronesia were from the following countries:

See also

Visa requirements for Micronesian citizens

References

Micronesia
Foreign relations of the Federated States of Micronesia